Streptomyces nanhaiensis is a bacterium species from the genus of Streptomyces which has been isolated from deep sea sediments from the northern South China Sea in China.

See also 
 List of Streptomyces species

References

Further reading

External links
Type strain of Streptomyces nanhaiensis at BacDive -  the Bacterial Diversity Metadatabase	

nanhaiensis
Bacteria described in 2012